John James Clements, VC (19 June 1872 – 18 June 1937) was a South African recipient of the Victoria Cross, the highest and most prestigious award for gallantry in the face of the enemy that can be awarded to British and Commonwealth forces.

Clements was 28 years old, and a corporal in Rimington's Guides, South African Forces during the Second Boer War when the following deed took place for which he was awarded the VC:

Following the end of the war, he went to the United Kingdom and received the decoration from the Prince of Wales during a large coronation parade of colonial troops in London on 1 July 1902.

Clements later achieved the rank of Sergeant serving in World War I.

References

Monuments to Courage (David Harvey, 1999)
The Register of the Victoria Cross (This England, 1997)
Victoria Crosses of the Anglo-Boer War (Ian Uys, 2000)

External links

 VC medal auction details
 

1872 births
1937 deaths
People from Middelburg, Eastern Cape
South African people of British descent
White South African people
Second Boer War recipients of the Victoria Cross
South African recipients of the Victoria Cross
British colonial army soldiers
South African military personnel of World War I